Mooroovare Vajragalu is a 1973 Indian Kannada-language film, directed by Y. R. Swamy. The film stars Rajkumar, Srinath, Jayanthi, Aarathi and Manjula. Rajkumar played a dual role in the movie. The film was Rajkumar's last full-fledged movie in black-and-white - thus also making it his last dual role in a black and white movie. Doorada Betta, which released in the same year, was black and white too, but had a few sequences in Eastmancolor.

Plot
This story is based on the epic of Mahabharatha.

Cast
 Rajkumar as Narada and Sri Krishna
 Srinath as Kritavarma
 Jayanthi as Satyavati
 Aarathi as Rukmini
 Manjula as Bhama
Gururajulu Naidu as Sudama
Leelavathi as wife of Sudama
K. S. Ashwath as Dharmaja
 Thoogudeepa Srinivas as Bhima
Ramesh as Arjuna
 Rajashankar as Balarama
Vajramuni as Duryodhana
 Prabhavati
 Shanimahadevappa as Shakuni
Jaya B as Saraswathi

Soundtrack
The music of the film was composed by R. Sudarshanam. The lyrics of the soundtrack were penned by Chi. Sadashivaiah and Chi. Udaya Shankar.

Track list

References

External links
 Mooroovare Vajragalu songs
 

1973 films
1970s Kannada-language films
Indian black-and-white films
Films based on the Mahabharata
Films directed by Y. R. Swamy